Clinton College may refer to 

Clinton College (Kentucky), a defunct college in Clinton, Kentucky
Clinton College (Tennessee), a defunct college in New Middleton, Tennessee
Clinton Junior College, Rock Hill, South Carolina

See also
Clinton Community College (disambiguation)